Wren is a crater on Mercury. Its name was adopted by the International Astronomical Union (IAU) in 1979. Wren is named for English architect Christopher Wren.

Wren is one of 110 peak ring basins on Mercury.

References